Volodymyr Andriyovych Olefir (born 26 February 1980, in Poltava) is a Ukrainian football defender who plays for FC Kremin Kremenchuk in the Ukrainian Second League.

Career 
Olefir has played for many clubs. He started in Vorksla-2 Poltava and continued through Agro Chişinău, Lukor Kalush, Prykarpattya Ivano-Frankivsk, Spartak-Horobyna Sumy, FC Vorskla-Naftohaz Poltava, Vorskla Poltava, Kryvbas Kryvyi Rih, Ilichyvets Mariupol and so on.

External links 

Official Website Profile

1980 births
Living people
Ukrainian footballers
Ukrainian expatriate footballers
FC Vorskla Poltava players
FC Spartak Ivano-Frankivsk players
FC Mariupol players
FC Kryvbas Kryvyi Rih players
FC Naftovyk-Ukrnafta Okhtyrka players
FC Obolon-Brovar Kyiv players
FC Bukovyna Chernivtsi players
FC Hoverla Uzhhorod players
MFC Mykolaiv players
FC Zirka Kropyvnytskyi players
FC Kremin Kremenchuk players
Expatriate footballers in Azerbaijan
Association football defenders
Sportspeople from Poltava